The Jasper A. Ware House, now known as the Wildwood Historic Center, is a historic one-and-a-half-story house in Nebraska City, Nebraska. It was built in 1869 for Jasper A. Ware, a farmer, real estate investor and co-founder of the Midland Pacific Railway. It was designed in the Gothic Revival style, with a "gabled roof, segmental arches, projecting gabled entrance pavilion, pointed arch window over entrance door, simple wooden tracery under two end gables." It has been listed on the National Register of Historic Places since July 16, 1973.

See also
Boscobel (Nebraska City, Nebraska), home of another co-founder of the railroad, also NRHP-listed

References

		
National Register of Historic Places in Otoe County, Nebraska
Gothic Revival architecture in Nebraska
Houses completed in 1869
1869 establishments in Nebraska